Aaron Henry may refer to:

 Aaron Henry (politician) (1922-1997), American civil rights leader and politician
 Aaron Henry Furlong (born 1967), American jewellery designer
 Aaron Henry (American football) (born 1988), American football player and coach
 Aaron Henry (wrestler) (born 1992), known as Aaron Henare, New Zealand professional wrestler
 Aaron Henry (basketball) (born 1999), American basketball player
 Aaron Henry (footballer) (born 2003), English footballer